Apisit Sorada (born February 28, 1997) is a Thai professional footballer who plays as a left back for Thai League 1 club BG Pathum United.

Honours

Club
BG Pathum United
 Thailand Champions Cup: 2021, 2022

References

External links

1997 births
Living people
Apisit Sorada
Apisit Sorada
Association football central defenders
Apisit Sorada
Apisit Sorada